Ma Shuyue (born 29 June 1999) is a Chinese tennis player.

On 18 March 2019, she achieved a career-high singles ranking of world No. 265. On 4 March 2019, she peaked at No. 522 in the doubles rankings.

Ma made her WTA Tour main-draw debut at the 2017 Shenzhen Open, partnering Zhang Kailin, and losing to Raquel Atawo and Xu Yifan.

ITF Circuit finals

Singles: 3 (2 titles, 1 runner–up)

Doubles: 2 (2 runner–ups)

External links
 
 

1999 births
Living people
Chinese female tennis players
21st-century Chinese women